The Coastal Wetlands Planning, Protection and Restoration Act (CWPPRA) was passed by Congress in 1990 to fund wetland enhancement.   In cooperation with multiple government agencies, CWPPRA is moving forward to restore the lost wetlands of the Gulf Coast as well as protecting the wetlands from future deterioration.  The scope of the mission is not simply for the restoration of Louisiana's Wetlands, but also the research and implementation of preventative measures for wetlands preservation.
 
CWPPRA is a partnership between the U.S. Army Corps of Engineers, the NOAA- National Marine Fisheries Service, the U.S. Fish and Wildlife Service, USDA Natural Resources Conservation Services, the Environmental Protection Agency, and the State of Louisiana.

Introduction 
Like most deltaic systems, the Louisiana coast is sinking. The natural occurrence of subsidence was historically offset by new sediment from the annual overflow of the Mississippi River. With construction of the river levees, this overflow was cut off, leaving the wetlands to continue sinking with no source of renourishment. Since the early 1900s, storms and anthropogenic impacts have compounded with subsidence to cause drastic land loss in coastal Louisiana. In the 20th century, Louisiana has lost more than 1 million acres from its coast, 24 square miles annually, because of both human and natural factors that have disrupted ecological and economic stability. Billions of dollars in seafood production, oil and gas revenue, and commercial shipping will be lost without Louisiana's coastal wetlands, which provide the basis and support for these industries. In terms of human life, the value of these wetlands is beyond estimation. Healthy marsh provides a buffer against storms, and its ability to absorb high water and slow wind is key to survival for coastal communities. As land is lost, hurricanes and tropical storms hit shore ever closer to the two million people who live near the coast. Every year as wetlands lose ground, these forces land closer to home. Without intervention, this ecosystem will be erased from the national landscape.

CWPPRA 
The Coastal Wetlands Planning, Protection and Restoration Act (CWPPRA) is also known as the Breaux Act due to the involvement of Louisiana U.S. Senator John Breaux in the Act's passage.The Act has several mandates:

Create a Task Force including the Secretaries of the Army, Interior, Agriculture and Commerce, the Administrator of EPA and the Governor of Louisiana
Submit a Priority Project List (PPL) each year
Submit a status report to Congress every three years
Include demonstration projects
Produce a state coastal restoration plan that includes: 
a goal of achieving no net loss of wetlands from development
designation of a single state agency responsible for implementation and enforcement
means to account for wetland gains and losses
assurance that the state will have adequate personnel, funding and authority to implement the plan
public education activities
encourage use of technology by developers to reduce impacts on wetlands
review of ways to assist landowners in wetland protection
Study the feasibility of increasing flow and sediment from the Mississippi River to the Atchafalaya River
Contributed costs as 75 percent federal/ 25 percent state until the submission of a comprehensive coastal restoration plan, after which the allocation is 85 percent federal, 15 percent state
Allow for up to 10 percent of the state share to be in the form of in-kind contributions such as land, easement or right-of-ways

Since 1990, 210 CWPPRA Projects have been authorized.

Funding 
The Sport Fish Restoration and Boating Trust Fund is CWPPRA's funding source supported by excise taxes on fishing equipment and small engine and motorboat fuel taxes. Funding for Louisiana CWPPRA projects is cost shared: a split of 85 percent Federal and 15 percent State of Louisiana. Funding for the Sport Fish Restoration and Boating Trust Fund is authorized through 2021 by the Fixing America's Surface Transportation (FAST) Act of 2015. The Trust Fund contributes 18.5 percent of its annual revenues to CWPPRA appropriations; that amount is divided as follows:
 70 percent Louisiana CWPPRA program
 15 percent Coastal Wetlands Conservation Grant program
 15 percent North American Wetlands Conservation Act (to coastal States only)
While the funds for the CWPPRA program are authorized through 2021, the program itself has only been re-authorized through FY 2019 by the Consolidated Appropriations Act of 2004.

Basin Project Areas 
There are 9 Hydrologic Basins in which CWPPRA projects are taking place:
Atchafalaya (AT)
Barataria (BA)
Brenton Sound (BS)
Calcasieu/ Sabine (CS)
Coastal Louisiana (LA) Encompasses all basins in the region
Mermentau (ME)
Mississippi River (MS)
Pontchartrain (PO)
Terrebonne (TE)
Teche/ Vermilion (TV)

CWPPRA’s Restoration Project List

Project Types 
Water and Sediment Diversion – Diversions allow fresh water from the Mississippi or Atchafalaya rivers to be re-introduced through wetland areas.  The flows provide the wetlands with a new source of sediment and nutrients and combat saltwater intrusion.
Outfall Management – Employed in conjunction with diversion projects, outfall management regulates water levels and flows, increasing the dispersion and retention time of fresh water, nutrients and sediment.
Hydrologic Restoration – This type of project reverts human-altered and troublesome drainage patterns toward more natural drainage patterns.
Shoreline Protection – Shoreline protection projects are designed to reduce or halt shoreline erosion.
Barrier Island Restoration – Designed to protect and restore barrier islands, this project type employs a variety of techniques, such as depositing dredged material to increase an island's size, placing rock breakwaters to reduce wave erosion, and placing sand-trapping fences and vegetative plantings to build and stabilize beaches and dunes.
Dredged Material Marsh Creation – Projects of this nature utilize dredged material, placing it in deteriorated wetlands or open water so that marsh plants will grow and form new marsh.
Sediment and Nutrient Trapping – Sediment and nutrient trapping is achieved by constructing or placing structures designed to slow water flow and promote the buildup of sediment.
Vegetative Planting – Used both separately and in conjunction with other project types, various kinds of marsh vegetation are planted to hold sediment together and stabilize soil.

Many restoration projects employ two or more restoration techniques.

Benefits of CWPPRA Projects 
 Benefits that CWPPRA projects contribute: 
Protection or reclamation of wetland acreage
Protection or creation of estuarine and marine habitats
Natural buffers that mitigate wind, wave and storm surge damage to communities, infrastructure and hurricane protection structures
Protection of oil and gas pipelines and distribution networks
Storm floodwater storage
Filtration and purification of water
Nurseries for fisheries
Wildlife habitat
Data to create a baseline of wetland conditions and to evaluate the efficacy of various approaches to wetland restoration

CWPPRA Task Force Members 
The task force consists of the State of Louisiana and five Federal Agencies:
State of Louisiana Governor's Office
U.S. Department of Defense
(U.S. Army Corps of Engineers (New Orleans District))
U.S. Department of Interior
(U.S. Fish and Wildlife Service)
U.S. Department of Agriculture
(USDA Natural Resources Conservation Service)
U.S. Department of Commerce
(NOAA National Marine Fisheries Service)
U.S. Environmental Protection Agency

Contact information for CWPPRA Task Force members can be found at LACoast.gov.

The Hurricane Effect 
In 2005, two of the United States' most devastating hurricanes hit the Gulf Coast (Hurricane Katrina, August 2005; Hurricane Rita, September 2005).  Their impact gained national attention due to the vast property damage and loss of life.  These two storms also impacted CWPPRA efforts for coastal restoration, for the better.  As scientists and policy makers seek ways to protect coastal communities and industries from future hurricanes, they look to the marshes and barrier islands that form the coast's first line of hurricane defense.   This is magnifying the importance of CWPPRA and related projects and the necessity for the successful restoration of the coastal wetlands.

More recently, in 2008, Hurricanes Gustav and Ike have left their mark on Louisiana's Coastal Wetlands.  Experts are comparing Hurricane Ike's impacts to those of Hurricane Rita in 2005.  Assessment of the impact is on-going and may not be fully realized for some time.

Related Restoration Projects 
CPRA – Coastal Protection and Restoration Authority of Louisiana
LCA – Louisiana Coastal Area – Louisiana, Ecosystem Restoration
CRMS – Coastwide Reference Monitoring System
CIAP – Coastal Impact Assistance Program
BTNEP – Barataria Terrebonne National Estuary Program
Coastal 2050
Brown Marsh
Caernarvon Freshwater Diversion Project
Davis Pond Freshwater Diversion Project
Coalition to Restore Coastal Louisiana

Additional Resources 
CWPPRA website
National Wetlands Research Center
CWPPRA Facebook
CWPPRA Twitter
CWPPRA Flickr
CWPPRA WordPress

See also 
Wetlands of Louisiana
National Wetlands Research Center
U.S. Geological Survey
Coastal Conservation Association

References 

1990 in law